Dušan Moravčík (born 27 May 1948 in Bánov, Czechoslovakia) is a former Slovak athlete who competed mainly in the 3000 metres steeplechase. He won silver medal in 3000 metres steeplechase at the 1971 European Athletics Championships.

Biography
Dušan Moravčík represented Czechoslovakia in three editions of the Summer Olympics (1972, 1976 and 1980). He is the current Czech records holder of the 3000 metres steeplechase.

Achievements

See also
List of European Athletics Championships medalists (men)
Czech records in athletics

References

External links
 
 
 
 
 

1948 births
Living people
Olympic athletes of Czechoslovakia
Athletes (track and field) at the 1972 Summer Olympics
Athletes (track and field) at the 1976 Summer Olympics
Athletes (track and field) at the 1980 Summer Olympics
European Athletics Championships medalists